Djamel Laroussi is an Algerian singer, composer, songwriter, arranger and guitar player.

Laroussi was born in Sidi Ben Adda, Algeria, moved to Cologne, Germany, to attend Cologne Academy of Music.
Since 2018 he is Member of the Group :de:Wildes Holz from Recklinghausen, Germany. 
Laroussi sings in Algerian Dziriya, French and Kabyle Berber. Djamel Laroussi was the first person from Africa to be admitted to the prestigious Music University of Cologne. He has graduated the school with honors as he was the first of his class, in composition and jazz arrangements, guitar and drums. He had been engaged in self-education before he was accepted to the University. Djamel is left-handed and plays the guitar upside down without reversing the strings. Being famous in Algeria, Djamel has been the Algerian representative for UNICEF since 2009. In cooperation with the Cultural Minister of Algeria he has set up an annual International Jazz-Festival in Algeria.
Stevie Wonder’s Band hired him as a member for the European tour In June and July 2010. During his creative career he has been playing with many Jazz musicians such as Graham Haynes, Steve Williamson, Nelson Veras, Keith Copeland, Chico Freeman. His music is a mixture of Western sound from Jazz and rock which is melt in his Arabic-Kabyle genes, and has always worked across different styles and genres.

Discography

 Etoile Filante (2002)
Live albums'''
 Live (2004)
 3 Marabouts (2007)
 Sapoutaly'' (2004)

References

Living people
Year of birth missing (living people)
Algerian emigrants to Germany
French-language singers
Kabyle people
People from Aïn Témouchent Province
21st-century Algerian  male singers